Lieut.-Col. Sir Henry Smith  (15 December 1835 – 2 March 1921) was a Scottish police officer who was Commissioner of the City of London Police.

Smith was born in Penpont, Dumfriesshire, Scotland, the son of Rev. George Smith of the Church of Scotland and Jane Hogarth.  He was educated at Edinburgh Academy. After serving as a constable in a Scottish county force, he went to London in 1879. He was unanimously elected to the post on 28 July 1890, the first to hold the post after joining the same force as a Constable. He had also been Acting Commissioner since the resignation of James Fraser.

He was appointed a Companion of the Order of the Bath (CB) in 1896 and Knight Commander of the Order of the Bath (KCB) in 1897. He tendered his resignation as Commissioner early in December 1902 due to friction with the Police Committee over the administration of the force and left office late that month.

He died in Edinburgh in 1921.

References

1836 births
1921 deaths
People educated at Edinburgh Academy
Officers in Scottish police forces
Scottish police officers
Knights Commander of the Order of the Bath
Commissioners of the City of London Police
People from Dumfries and Galloway